Indecision may refer to: 
Indecision (band), a 1990s hardcore punk band from the United States
Indecision Records, an American hardcore punk record label established in 1992
A series of special television programs on American elections on the Comedy Central channel including:
InDecision 92
Comedy Central's Indecision 2000
The Daily Show: Indecision 2004
The Daily Show: Indecision 2006
Comedy Central's Indecision 2008
InDecision, a recurring segment and title on The Daily Show
Indecision, a 2005 novel by American author Benjamin Kunkel
"Indecision" (Steven Page song)
"Indecision", a song on the 1979 album Sheep Farming in Barnet by Toyah
Indecision, the original name of the Canadian pop group soulDecision

See also 
Decision-making
Decision (disambiguation)